Richard Ball (May 8, 1932 - September 7, 2019) was a Republican member of the Michigan House of Representatives from 2005-2010 representing Shiawassee County and three townships in Clinton County.

Biography 
He had been an optometrist in Owosso for over 50 years, following the tradition of his father, Dr. L.P. Ball, who practiced in Owosso for 54 years. Dr. Ball received a lifetime achievement award from the Michigan Optometric Association in 2001.

He received a doctorate in visual experimental psychology from Michigan State University, and an optometry degree from Ohio State University in 1955. Dr. Ball was very active in the formation of the Michigan College of Optometry at Ferris State University. He also served on the Owosso school board for 16 years.

References

1932 births
2019 deaths
People from Owosso, Michigan
Michigan State University alumni
Ohio State University alumni
School board members in Michigan
Republican Party members of the Michigan House of Representatives
Ferris State University people
21st-century American politicians